The Sonex Electric Sport Aircraft (ESA) was a two-place (one place with additional batteries) aircraft design that was under development by Sonex Aircraft, using the  Sonex e-Flight electric system for thrust.  Sonex designed this aircraft as a part of an attempt to develop alternate fuels, to ensure feasibility of inexpensive sport aviation in the future.

The last update on the project was put out by the company in 2011 and the webpage about it was removed in 2017.

Design and development
The ESA was designed to use the Sonex e-Flight electric system, which was concurrently under development. The airframe was developed from the Xenos, and was not intended to compete with the other aircraft in the Sonex line.  The initial flights, however, have used a Waiex airframe, and were centered around testing the electric power system.  The aircraft was to be aluminum riveted, and features were to include a shortened wingspan and tail tips (in relation to the Xenos), aerobatic wing tips, 8' flaps instead of spoilers, and for the center of gravity, an auxiliary battery and controller in the tail cone.

The electrical system was 270 volts and 200 amps, and was intended to be adjustable to different power outputs.  As of 2007, the brushless DC-Cobalt motor was designed be very lightweight, at only , to operate at 90% efficiency, and to use Lithium-ion and Lithium-polymer batteries.

For safety, the batteries were contained in "safety boxes", which were designed, in the event of a problem, to direct fire or explosion through designated holes, and to help cool the cells normally.  In the final version, the batteries were intended able to be charged in the aircraft, while retaining the ability to be easily removed and swap them with other batteries.  The design won the Lindberg Electric Aircraft Prize for the "Best Electric Aircraft Sub-System or Component Technology" at Airventure 2010, and at that time the first completion of a production aircraft was anticipated for the end of 2011.

Specifications

References

External links
Manufacturer Website
ESA Development website archives on Archive.org
E-flight Updates with video archives on Archive.org

2010s United States sport aircraft
Light-sport aircraft
Homebuilt aircraft
Single-engined tractor aircraft
Electric aircraft
Electric Sport
Aircraft first flown in 2010
V-tail aircraft